Kinlet is a civil parish in Shropshire, England.  It contains 16 listed buildings that are recorded in the National Heritage List for England.  Of these, two are listed at Grade I, the highest of the three grades, one is at Grade II*, the middle grade, and the others are at Grade II, the lowest grade.  The parish contains the village of Kinlet and the surrounding countryside; all the listed buildings are scattered around the countryside.  These consist of a 12th-century church and a cross base in the churchyard, a former country house and associated structures, smaller houses, farmhouses and cottages, and four milestones.


Key

Buildings

References

Citations

Sources

Lists of buildings and structures in Shropshire